Hillcrest, Ontario, may refer to:

Hillcrest, a place in Prince Edward County, Ontario
Hillcrest, Norfolk County, Ontario, a hamlet